Charles Tennyson Turner (4 July 1808 – 25 April 1879) was an English poet.
Born in Somersby, Lincolnshire, he was an elder brother of Alfred Tennyson; his friendship and the "heart union" with his brother is revealed in Poems by Two Brothers (1829). Another poet brother was Frederick Tennyson.

In 1833, Charles was ordained a priest in the Church of England. On 1 October 1835, he changed his surname to Turner after inheriting the estate of his great-uncle, the Reverend Samuel Turner of Caistor in Lincolnshire. On 24 May 1836, he married Louisa Sellwood, the younger sister of Alfred's future wife; she later suffered from mental illness and became an opium addict. Charles died on 25 April 1879, at the age of 70, at 6 Imperial Square in Cheltenham, Gloucestershire.

Turner was key in the construction of Grasby, a small village on the outskirts of Caistor. He helped construct part of the school (Grasby School) and was the vicar of Grasby Church for a while.

Published works
 Sonnets (1864)
 Small Tableaux (1868)
 Sonnets, Lyrics and Translations (1873)
 Collected Poems (1880, 8 months after death), assembled by Alfred and Hallam Tennyson, and James Spedding

References

External links
 
 

People from East Lindsey District
1808 births
1879 deaths
Charles
English male poets
19th-century English poets
19th-century English male writers
People from Caistor